Alf Rigby was an Ireland international footballer. Rigby played for several clubs in the League of Ireland including Bray Unknowns, St James's Gate and Dundalk. He was also the top goalscorer in the League of Ireland for two successive seasons.

Playing career

St James's Gate
In 1933–34 and 1934–35, while playing for St James's Gate, Rigby was the top scorer in the League of Ireland, scoring 13 and 17 goals respectively. On 17 March 1934 he also played for Gate in the FAI Cup final which Gate lost 2–1 to Cork. Rigby's goals helped Gate finish as runners–up in the 1934–35 League of Ireland season and then win the 1935–36 League of Ireland Shield.

International career
During the 1934–35 season Rigby played three times for Ireland. On 16 December 1934 he made his debut against Hungary in a 4–2 defeat at Dalymount Park. In May 1935 he was a member of an Ireland squad that went on a European tour. On 5 May he played in 1–0 against Switzerland. Then on 8 May he played in a 3–1 defeat against Germany. Rigby made all three of his international appearances while playing for St James's Gate.

Honours
St James's Gate 
League of Ireland Shield
Winners: 1935–36
League of Ireland 
Runners Up: 1934–35 
FAI Cup
Runners Up: 1933–34
Individual
League of Ireland Top Scorer: 
 1933–34, 1934–35

References

Republic of Ireland association footballers
Republic of Ireland international footballers
St James's Gate F.C. players
Dundalk F.C. players
League of Ireland players
Year of birth missing
Place of birth missing
Year of death missing
Association football forwards